Victor E. Tayback (January 6, 1930 – May 25, 1990) was an American actor. He is known for his role as Mel Sharples in the film Alice Doesn't Live Here Anymore (1974) and the television series Alice (1976–1985). The latter earned him two consecutive Golden Globe Awards and a Primetime Emmy Award nomination.

Life and career
Tayback was born in Brooklyn, New York, to Helen (née Hanood) and Najeeb James Tayback. His parents were immigrants from Aleppo, Syria. He moved with his family to Burbank, California during his teenage years and attended Burbank High School, from which he graduated in 1947. He also attended Glendale Community College and the Frederick A. Speare School of Radio and TV Broadcasting.

Tayback served in the United States Navy before beginning his acting career at the age of 25. A lifetime member of the Actors Studio, he was a familiar face on television in the 1960s and 1970s, appearing on numerous series, including The Man from U.N.C.L.E., Star Trek, Bonanza, Here Come the Brides, That Girl , Gunsmoke, The Mary Tyler Moore Show, The Partridge Family, All in the Family, Fantasy Island, Columbo, and The Love Boat. He also appeared in many films such as Bullitt (1968), Papillon (1973), The Gambler (1974), The Cheap Detective (1978), and All Dogs Go to Heaven (1989), as well as more than 25 stage productions, including Twelve Angry Men, The Diary of Anne Frank, Death of a Salesman, and Brighton Beach Memoirs. He was the co-founder of the theater troupe Company of Angels.

Tayback's most famous role was diner owner Mel Sharples in both the film Alice Doesn't Live Here Anymore (1974) and the television series Alice (1976–1985). He was the only actor in the original film to reprise his role for the rest of the series. For the role, he was nominated for a Primetime Emmy Award in 1978 and won two consecutive Golden Globe Awards in 1980 and 1981.

Filmography

The Power of the Resurrection (1958) – Simon the Canaanite
T-Bird Gang (1959) – Cop #1 at gas station 
Gangster Story (1959) – Norm, Resort Guard (uncredited)
North to Alaska (1960) – Roustabout (uncredited)
Five Minutes to Live (1961) – Fred Dorella
With Six You Get Eggroll (1968) – Truck Driver 
Bullitt (1968) – Pete Ross
Blood and Lace (1971) – Calvin Carruthers
Emperor of the North Pole (1973) – Yardman
The Blue Knight (1973) – Neil Grogan
The Don Is Dead (1973) – Ralph Negri
Papillon (1973) – Sergeant
Thunderbolt and Lightfoot (1974) – Mario Pinski
The Gambler (1974) – One
Alice Doesn't Live Here Anymore (1974) – Mel
Report to the Commissioner (1975) – Lt. Seidensticker
Lepke (1975) – Lucky Luciano
No Deposit, No Return (1976) – Big Joe
The Big Bus (1976) – Goldie
Special Delivery (1976) – Wyatt
Mansion of the Doomed (1976) – Detective Simon
The Shaggy D.A. (1976) – Eddie Roschak
The Choirboys (1977) – Zoony
The Cheap Detective (1978) – Lt. DiMaggio
Treasure Island (1985) – Silver
Weekend Warriors (1986) – Sgt. Burdge
The Underachievers (1987) – Coach
Loverboy (1989) – Harry Bruckner
Beverly Hills Bodysnatchers (1989) – Lou
All Dogs Go to Heaven (1989) – Carface Caruthers (voice)

Television
 Alice (1976-1985) as Mel Sharples
 Griff as Captain Barney Marcus. Series starred Lorne Greene in title role and Ben Murphy
 Khan! as Lt. Gubbins
 I Dream Of Jeannie as Turhan In the episode "This Is Murder"
 Buckskin (Episode: "The Battle of Gabe Pruitt") – Claude
 Alfred Hitchcock Presents (Episode: "A Man with a Problem") (1958) – Man Talking to Cabdriver
 77 Sunset Strip (1960) (Episode: Trouble in the Middle East) Bearded Rebel
 Rawhide (Episode: "The Gray Rock Hotel") (1965) – Monte
 F Troop (Episode: "Corporal Agarn's Farewell To The Troops") (1965) – Bill Colton
 The Man from U.N.C.L.E. (Episode:  "The Re-Collectors Affair") (1965) – Sargent
 Daniel Boone (Episode: "Onatha") (1966) – Hongas
  Family Affair (Episode: 8 Season 1 "Who's Afraid of Nural Shpeni?") (1966) - Policeman
 Gunsmoke (Episode: "Ladies From St. Louis") (1967) – Gaines
 Get Smart (Episode: "Appointment in Sahara") (1967) – Jamal
 The Monkees (Episodes: "Your Friendly Neighborhood Kidnappers", "Son of a Gypsy" and "Art for Monkees' Sake") (1966–1967) – Chuche / Rocco / George
 Here Come the Brides (recurring logger) (1968-1970)
 Star Trek: The Original Series (Episode: "A Piece of the Action") (1968) – Jojo Krako
 That Girl as Max . season 3, episode 12 (1968)
 Lancer (Episode: "Devil's Blessing") (1969) - Porter
The Bill Cosby Show (Episode: "The Fatal Phone Call") (1969) - Calvin
Bonanza (Episode 358 "Caution, Easter Bunny Crossing". Season 11 Episode 25) (1970) - Everett Gaskell
The Partridge Family (Episode: Danny & The Mob) 1971 The Mary Tyler Moore Show (Episode: "Second Story Story") (1971) – Officer Jackson
 Bewitched (Episode: "The Good Fairy Strikes Again") (1971) – Officer #1
 Columbo (Episode: "Suitable for Framing") (1971) – Sam Franklin
 The F.B.I. (Episode: "The Natural") (1971) - Ed Larch
 The F.B.I. (Episode: "Dark Journey") (1972) - Neil Parks
 Arnie (Episode: "Boom or Bust") (1972) – Sergeant
 The Bold Ones: The New Doctors (Episode: "Is This Operation Necessary?") (1972) – Frank Wells
 Emergency! (Episode: "Boot") (1973) – truck driver.
 All in the Family (Episode: "Et Tu, Archie?") (1974) – Joe Tucker
 Barney Miller (Episode: "Stakeout", "The Social Worker") (1975) – Mr. Savocheck / master forger
 The Practice (Episode: "The Choice") (1976) – Frankie Nyles
 Mary Hartman, Mary Hartman (Episode: 29, Season: 1) (1976)
 Hawaii Five-O (Episode: "Bones of Contention" ; "Angel in Blue") (1975–1978) – Martin Lynch / Parmel
 The Eddie Capra Mysteries (Episode: "How Do I Kill Thee?") (1978) – Logan
 $weepstake$ (Episode: "Billy, Wally and Ludmilla, and Theodore") (1979) – Sgt. Yarbrough
 The Love Boat (Episode: "Friends & Lovers; Sergeant Bull; Miss Mother") (1980) – Sgt. Harry Beluski
 Flo (Episode: "What Are Friends For?") (1981) – Mel Sharples
 Fantasy Island (1979–1983, Multiple) –  George Walters / Norman Atkins / Chet Nolan / Melvyn Mews
 T. J. Hooker (Episode: "Hooker's War") (1982) – Lt. Pete Benedict
 Hotel (Episode: "Relative Loss") (1983) – Wallace Egan
 Finder of Lost Loves (Episode: "Maxwell Ltd: Finder of Lost Loves Pilot") (1984) – Thomas Velasco
 Murder, She Wrote  (Episode: "One Good Bid Deserves a Murder") (1986) – Sal Domino
 Crazy Like a Fox (1986)
 The Love Boat (1977–1987, Multiple) – Himself / Jack Hamilton / Shelley Sommers / 'Dutch' Boden / Sgt. Harry Beluski / Harry Stewart
 Adderly (1987) – Gregorin
 Tales from the Darkside (Episodes: "The New Man", (as Alan Coombs) Season 1, 1984, and "Basher Malone" (as Tippy Ryan) Season 4, 1988)
 MacGyver (1990, Episode: "Jenny's Chance") – George Henderson (final television appearance)

Awards and nominations

Personal life
Tayback was married to Sheila Maureen Barnard (1932–2001) from March 16, 1963, until his death on May 25, 1990. They had a son, Christopher (born 1963), who is a business trial lawyer and former prosecutor.

Death
Tayback died of a heart attack at age 60 in Glendale, California on May 25, 1990. He is buried at Forest Lawn Memorial Park (Hollywood Hills).

References

Further reading
Putt, Jr., Barry M. (2019). Alice: Life Behind the Counter in Mel's Greasy Spoon (A Guide to the Feature Film, the TV Series, and More)''. Albany, Georgia: BearManor Media. .

External links
 Vic Tayback biography, as cast member from "Alice"
 
 
 
 
 

1930 births
1990 deaths
American male film actors
American people of Syrian descent
American people of Arab descent
American male stage actors
American male television actors
American male voice actors
Best Supporting Actor Golden Globe (television) winners
Male actors from Glendale, California
Male actors from New York City
Burials at Forest Lawn Memorial Park (Hollywood Hills)
20th-century American male actors
People from Brooklyn